The Willard Library is a private donation library incorporated in 1881 to serve the city of Evansville, Indiana, and to carry out the terms of a private trust. The Willard Library houses a trove of local archives and genealogical materials in addition to its collection of standard publications. It is built in the Gothic Revival style, designed by James W. Reid (of Reid & Reid).  It was listed on the National Register of Historic Places in 1972.

History 
Willard Carpenter, Evansville's "pioneer of public charity," built and endowed Willard Library. He established a trust fund in 1876 about which he wrote:

"I have concluded . . . to establish and endow a public library, to be located in a public park, on land owned by me, situated in the city of Evansville. I am induced to do this in well-grounded hope that such an institution may become useful toward the improvement of the moral and intellectual culture of the inhabitants of Evansville . . . and also toward the enlargement and diffusion of a taste for the fine arts."

An agent for the Underground Railroad before the Civil War, Mr. Carpenter incorporated his concern for the rights of African Americans into his requirement that the library "be maintained for the free use of all persons who may desire to consult it." This definition of a "public" library was a daring social experiment in the latter half of the nineteenth century.

The library was named "Willard Library" rather than "Carpenter Library" because, while living in Troy, New York, Carpenter became enamored with the Emma Willard School, a Troy female seminary founded by Emma Willard. He decided to found an educational institution and name it "Willard". Although initially conceived as a college, the idea was refocused to constructing a library.

The library building was started in 1876 at First Avenue and Pennsylvania Streets in Carpenter's field, a place where circuses once pitched their tents. A depressed economy halted construction in 1877. The building's foundation lay for five years unfinished. The building was resumed in 1882 and Carpenter devoted the rest of his life to the supervision of the building. He worked with the architects, hired the workmen himself, and saw to it that only the best materials were used. Reid & Reid became the architects and are credited with the design of the superstructure. The formal opening was held March 28, 1885.

Architecture 
The library is built with the characteristic features of Victorian Gothic architecture. Notable architectural features employing this style include the tower, steeply pitched roofs with ornamental gables, color contrast resulting from the use of white stone and brick, and window arcades with Gothic arches. The capitals supporting the arcade arches were apparently only roughed out prior to the carving, which was never completed. Terra cotta was used extensively for exterior decoration in the form of rosettes and owls (symbols of wisdom) in roundels seen in the side gables.

The interior woodwork is finished in select quarter-grain oak. The doorways and grand staircase make an imposing entrance, also in the style of Victorian Gothic architecture.

Genealogy and local history collections 
Willard Library is home to a vast range of genealogy and local history special collections on their second floor. Opened in August 1976 the collections include: fifty state references, family histories in book, microform, manuscript, and loose-paper formats, Vanderburgh County newspapers from 1821 to the present, newspapers from selected surrounding counties, Vanderburgh County records (on microfilm), church records in several formats, Catholic Diocese records (on microfilm), records of local and area cemeteries and funeral homes, DAR book collection, and several online databases and three major search engines: Heritage Quest, Genealogy Bank, and Ancestry Library. The Library hosts an annual "Midnight Madness" event where the library is open until midnight all week for research purposes. Genealogists and others come from all over to research family histories, etc.

The Tri-State Genealogical Society formed in partnership with the Special Collections department at the library. They publish a packet every September, December, March, and June for their members.

Governance 
Willard has a self-perpetuating seven-member board of directors. During all periods of its operation, Willard has been and continues to be open and free to residents of Vanderburgh County and neighboring counties. It also receives public financial support through a tax levy, though this tax levy must be approved by the Evansville Vanderburgh Public Library.

Haunting 
The Willard Library is purported to be haunted by a specter known as the "Grey Lady". The library has hosted a popular webcam since 1999 which allows visitors to capture images at various locations. In mid-October, the library hosts a free annual ghost tour.

References

Further reading
 Donald E. Baker, Director of the Willard Library Evansville. Two Publics: The Willard Library and the Evansville-Vanderburgh County Library, Indiana Libraries, Volume 6, Number 2 (1986)
 History of Vanderburgh County, Indiana, from earliest times to the present; with biographical sketches, reminiscences, etc, by Brant and Fuller, 1889, Chapter X.

External links

Willard Library, official site
Tri-State Genealogical Society, official site
Willard Library Ghostcams

Libraries on the National Register of Historic Places in Indiana
Library buildings completed in 1885
National Register of Historic Places in Evansville, Indiana
Reid & Reid buildings
Gothic Revival architecture in Indiana
Libraries in Indiana
Tourist attractions in Evansville, Indiana
Reportedly haunted locations in Indiana